A by-election was held for the New South Wales Legislative Assembly seat of Wollongong-Kembla on 29 February 1964. It was triggered by the resignation of Rex Connor to successfully contest the federal seat of Cunningham at the 1963 election.

Dates

Result

Rex Connor resigned.

See also
Electoral results for the district of Wollongong-Kembla
List of New South Wales state by-elections

References

1964 elections in Australia
New South Wales state by-elections
1960s in New South Wales
February 1964 events in Australia